Rushinga is a Senatorial constituency in the Senate of Zimbabwe. It covers most of the Rushinga District in Mashonaland Central Province, and is one of six senatorial constituencies in the province.

The equivalent seats in the House of Assembly are:

 Rushinga

In the 2008 election, the constituency elected Damien Mumvuri as senator after campaigning unopposed.

Mashonaland Central Province
Parliamentary constituencies in Zimbabwe